The 2008–09 International Hockey League season was the 18th season of the International Hockey League (Colonial Hockey League before 1997, United Hockey League before 2007), a North American minor professional league. Six teams participated in the regular season and the Fort Wayne Komets won the league title.

Regular season

Turner Cup-Playoffs

External links 
 Season 2008/09 on hockeydb.com

United Hockey League seasons
IHL
IHL